Agda Helin (27 October 1894 – 10 February 1984) was a Swedish actress. She appeared in more than 60 films between 1912 and 1968.

Selected filmography

 House Slaves (1923)
 South of the Highway (1936)
 The Three of Us (1940)
 Lasse-Maja (1941)
 Life Goes On (1941)
 Only a Woman (1941)
 The Talk of the Town (1941)
 Adventurer (1942)
 The Sixth Shot (1943)
 She Thought It Was Him (1943)
 Change of Train (1943)
 Imprisoned Women (1943)
 There's a Fire Burning (1943)
 Motherhood (1945)
 The Journey Away (1945)
 The Österman Brothers' Virago (1945)
 Incorrigible (1946)
 Crime in the Sun (1947)
 Knockout at the Breakfast Club (1950)
 My Name Is Puck (1951)
 Speed Fever (1953)
 Whoops! (1955)
 A Goat in the Garden (1958)
 Ön (1966)
 Shame (1968)

References

External links

1894 births
1984 deaths
20th-century Swedish actresses
Swedish film actresses
Swedish silent film actresses
Swedish television actresses
People from Hallstahammar Municipality